Vitali Menshikov (born 15 July 1989) is a Russian professional ice hockey player. A defenceman, he is currently an unrestricted free agent who most recently played with HC Vityaz of the Kontinental Hockey League (KHL).

Menshikov made his KHL debut playing with Avtomobilist Yekaterinburg during the 2012–13 KHL season.

References

External links

1989 births
Living people
Russian ice hockey defencemen
Admiral Vladivostok players
Avangard Omsk players
Avtomobilist Yekaterinburg players
HC Dynamo Moscow players
Graz 99ers players
Jokerit players
Metallurg Magnitogorsk players
HC Sibir Novosibirsk players
Sportspeople from Chelyabinsk
Traktor Chelyabinsk players
HC Vityaz players
Zauralie Kurgan players
Universiade medalists in ice hockey
Universiade bronze medalists for Russia
Competitors at the 2013 Winter Universiade